Kala (stylized in all caps) is a Filipino band that blends funk, nu-disco, acid jazz, electronic and rock music. Its members are Brian Tanchanco, JP Tanchanco, Jade Justine, and Andrew Contreras.

History

KALA's first full-length album came on the music scene in 2005 with their debut album under Sony BMG entitled Manila High. The group is most noted for its hit single “Jeepney” and is credited with the  resurgence of a distinct and defining genre of Filipino music known as “Manila sound”. The name “Kala” originates from the original members’ college cake-making venture called the “Kala Cake Project”.

In 2008, KALA underwent a self-imposed hiatus following the departures of bassist Lyle Pasco, lead guitarist JP Tanchanco and lead vocalist Mike Grape from the band.

In 2011, KALA resurfaced with new members Jade Justine and Voopee Elviña.

Following their come back, KALA performed in Jack Daniel's third Philippine tour entitled “Jack Daniel’s On Stage: Scouting Gigs” on November 22, 2013.

Lead guitarist Voopee Elviña died on December 4, 2015 after a battle with nasopharyngeal cancer.

KALAMAN

During a summer vacation in Boracay last 2004, some of the old band members had a picture posing in silhouette against the sunset. Various poses were made which represented each of the band members. Brian decided to combine prominent elements of each pose in order to blend it in one unifying image. This became the official logo of KALA. It represents convergence and harmony with the sharing of friendship, talents and passion from each of the band members.

Advocacy

In 2004, KALA started performing for Rock Ed Philippines, a nationwide volunteer group that offers alternative education to underprivileged Filipino youth through art, music, poetry, and the like. In the same year, the band released an EP entitled “RockEdition: For the Benefit of the Filipino Youth” by way of support for the UN's “Millennium Development Goals” and “Global Call to Action Against Poverty.”

In 2011, KALA performed for Rock Ed once again in their “Rock the Riles: Rocking for Education” tour.

Awards and nominations

Band members

Current members

Brian Tanchanco: lead vocals, keytar, keyboards, synths (2004-2008; 2010–present)
JP Tanchanco: lead guitar (2004-2008; 2015–present)
Jade Justine: bass guitar (2010–present)
Andrew Contreras: drums (2015–present)

Former members
Voopee Elviña: lead guitar, backup vocals (2010–2015, deceased)
Raymond Daylo: drums, backup vocals (2004-2008; 2010–2015)
Lyle Pasco: bass guitar (2005-2008)
William Gabaldon: bass guitar (2004-2005)
Mike Grape: lead vocals (2004-2008; 2010-2012)

Discography

Future Disco (2013)
Touch Me Kiss Me
Ella Villamor
Dr. Strange
Tipar
Imaginary Lucy
Future Disco
Libot
The Race
Pag Ikot
Feel My Love

Manila High (2005)
Pulis Pangkalawakan
Parapap
Jeepney
Sync of 8
South Side
Piso Pisong Paraiso
Manila High
Salamin
Bakbakan Na
Tubero
Weather Forecast
Jeepney (Nude Mix)

RockEdition: For the Benefit of the Filipino Youth (2004)
Pulis Pangkalawakan
Pira Pirasong Paraiso
Southside
Salamin
Bakbakan Na

Collaborations
The Best of Manila Sound: Hopia Mani Popcorn (Viva Records, 2006)
Environmentally Sound: A Select Anthology of Songs Inspired by the Earth (World Wide Fund for Nature, 2006)
Pinoy Soul Movement (Warner Music Philippines, 2007)

References

External links

Musical groups established in 2004
Manila sound groups
Acid jazz ensembles
Filipino rock music groups
Funk rock musical groups
Musical groups from Metro Manila